Wakefield is an eight-part Australian television drama series that premiered on ABC iview on 2 April 2021 and was shown on  ABC TV in weekly episodes from Sunday 18 April.

At the 2021 ARIA Music Awards, the music was nominated for Best Original Soundtrack, Cast or Show Album. Hallmark of said soundtrack are the remarkedly different variations of Dexys Midnight Runners' Come On Eileen (used with brio to vehiculate the protagonist's own deteriorating mental health).

Synopsis
Wakefield is a psychological mystery revolving around the staff and patients who populate Ward C of a psychiatric hospital in the Blue Mountains of New South Wales, centred on psychiatric nurse Nik.

Cast
Rudi Dharmalingam as Nikhil "Nik" Katira, a warm empathetic nurse at Wakefield Psychiatric Hospital, son of Indian immigrants Rashaal and Jeshna, and brother of Renuka 
 Kershawn Theodore as 12-year-old Nik
Nirish Bhat Surambadka as young Nik
 Geraldine Hakewill as Dr. Kareena Wells, the leading doctor of the ward, Nik's former fiancée, and wife of David
 Mandy McElhinney as Linda, acting Nursing Unit Manager 
 Felicity Ward as Collette, a Wakefield nurse, friend of Nik, with a penchant for new age and self-development techniques 
 Sam Simmons as Pete Seaman, a Wakefield nurse
 Pacharo Mzembe as Dr Rohan Achebe, a gaming-addicted doctor at Wakefield 
 Dan Wyllie as James Matos, a businessman who continues to negotiate a property deal while a patient; husband of Leyla and father of Ted
 Shapoor Batliwalla as Rashaal Katira, Nikhil and Renuka's father 
 Nadie Kammallaweera as Jeshna Katira, Nikhil and Renuka's mother and Rashaal's ex-wife 
 Monica Kumar as Renuka, Nikhil's soon-to-be-married sister
 Harriet Dyer as Genevieve, patient with bipolar disorder, wife of Raff
 Ryan Corr as Raff, Genevieve's husband
 Harry Greenwood as Trevor, a patient whose psychosis has been exacerbated by taking crystal meth; singer/songwriter 
 Bessie Holland as Tessa Knight, a milliner staying at Wakefield for her self-harm, anger issues, and compulsive hoarding; likes puzzles and art
 Kim Gyngell as Zelco, a professional musician staying at Wakefield
 Richie Miller as Omar, a Wakefield patient in a vegetative state, fiancé of Tamara 
Henry Nixon as David, Kareena's husband
Colin Friels as Baz Madden, patient, a poet with anger issues
 Megan Smart as Ivy, a young mother to her two-month-old daughter Saskia staying at Wakefield due to her post-natal depression
 Sid Joshi
 Ursula Yovich as Maria, a mediator who negotiates with Petrov, Linda, and Collette to settle damages
 Shagun Garg
 Guy Simon as Colin/Mr Invisible, a patient who believes himself to be invisible
 Miritana Hughes as Seffa, a patient who believes he is a prophet of god
 Victoria Haralabidou as Cath, a patient who systematically organises the actions of every patient and employee at Wakefield
 Wayne Blair as Vince, a cockroach exterminator
 Heather Mitchell as Belle, Tessa's mother
 Jonathan Chan as Sun
 David Nash [Troy The Security Guard] 
 Matt Nable as Michael Fitzpatrick, a patient who believes himself to be disappeared Prime Minister Harold Holt 
 Nicholas Brown as Kiran, husband-to-be of Renuka 
 Skanda Jammalamadaka as Dilshan, Nikhil and Renuka's baby brother
 Caroline Brazier as Leyla Matos, wife of James 
 Anthony Brandon Wong as James' business partner
 Veena Sudarshan as Geetha, Jeshna's friend
 Stephen Hunter as Stephan, Linda's date
 Alex Menglet as Petrov, a man whose car is deliberately damaged by Linda in a car park

Episodes

Production
The eight-part series was filmed in 2020, at a number of locations in Australia: Sydney; the Blue Mountains; a New South Wales (NSW) northern rivers cane farm near Murwillumbah with Mt. Warning as a backdrop; and Southern Highlands of NSW. Wakefield is created by Kristen Dunphy, who is also the showrunner with Sam Meikle. The series is written by Kristen Dunphy, Sam Meikle, Joan Sauers and Cathy Strickland. It is directed by Jocelyn Moorhouse and Kim Mordaunt.

International broadcast 
Showtime acquired the U.S. broadcast rights for the series, which premiered on 18 October 2021.

References

External links 

Wakefield at ABC IVIEW

2020s Australian drama television series
2021 Australian television series debuts
2021 Australian television series endings
Television shows set in New South Wales
Australian Broadcasting Corporation original programming
English-language television shows